The Nyawaygi language, also spelt Nyawaygi, Nywaigi, or Nawagi, is an extinct Australian Aboriginal language that was spoken by the Nyawaygi people in North Queensland, on the east coast of Australia. The Nyawaygi language region includes the landscape within the Hinchinbrook Regional Council, Halifax Bay, and Rollingstone.

Nyawaygi had the smallest number of consonants, 12, of any Australian language. It had 7 conjugations, 3 open and 4 closed, the latter including monosyllabic roots, and, in this regard, conserved a feature of proto-Pama–Nyungan lost from contiguous languages.

Vocabulary 
Some words from the Nyawaygi language, as spelt and written by Nyawaygi authors include:

 Alu: head
 Angal: boomerang
 Balgan: stone
 Buramu: butterfly
 Gabagan: aunt
 Touca tula: good day
 Wadi: laugh
 Yunggul: one

Notes

External links 

 Nywaigi Language Recordings, State Library of Queensland

Dyirbalic languages
Extinct languages of Queensland
Languages extinct in the 2000s
2009 disestablishments in Australia